Robert Edwin Waldron (January 25, 1920 – October 25, 2000) was a Republican politician from Michigan who served in the Michigan House of Representatives, and as Speaker of the House in 1967 and 1968. He was the last Republican Speaker until Paul Hillegonds 25 years later.

References

1920 births
2000 deaths
Speakers of the Michigan House of Representatives
Republican Party members of the Michigan House of Representatives
Politicians from Brookline, Massachusetts
Dartmouth College alumni
University of Michigan alumni
20th-century American politicians